United Nations Security Council resolution 856, adopted unanimously on 10 August 1993, after reaffirming Resolution 813 (1993) and welcoming a peace agreement signed, under the auspices of the Economic Community of West African States (ECOWAS), between the Interim Government of National Unity of Liberia (IGNU), the National Patriotic Front of Liberia (NPFL), and the United Liberation Movement for Democracy (ULIMO), the Council approved a dispatch of 30 military observers to Liberia.

The Council discussed the proposed establishment of the United Nations Observer Mission in Liberia (UNOMIL), further announcing that the military observers would participate in the work of the Joint Cease-fire Monitoring Committee, including in particular to monitor, investigate and report ceasefire violations for a period of three months. A report of the Secretary-General Boutros Boutros-Ghali was anticipated concerning the proposed establishment of UNOMIL and its financial costs, a time-frame and projected conclusion of the operation and co-operation with the ECOWAS peacekeeping force already in Liberia.

All parties to the conflict were urged to respect and implement the ceasefire and ensure the safety of all United Nations and other peacekeeping and humanitarian personnel in the country. It also called for the conclusion of a Status of Forces Agreement. Finally, the efforts of the Organisation of African Unity and the Economic Community of West African States Monitoring Group in Liberia were praised.

See also
 Charles Taylor
 First Liberian Civil War
 List of United Nations Security Council Resolutions 801 to 900 (1993–1994)

References

External links
 
Text of the Resolution at undocs.org

 0856
20th century in Liberia
 0856
August 1993 events
1993 in Liberia